The men's 400 metres event at the 1967 Summer Universiade was held at the National Olympic Stadium in Tokyo on 30 and 31 August 1967.

Medalists

Results

Heats

Final

References

Athletics at the 1967 Summer Universiade
1967